Ötzingen is an Ortsgemeinde – a community belonging to a Verbandsgemeinde – in the Westerwaldkreis in Rhineland-Palatinate, Germany.

Geography 

The community lies at the foot of the Malberg, a wooded volcanic cone found within the neighbouring community of Moschheim. Other neighbouring communities are Leuterod, Niederahr, Oberahr, Ettinghausen, Kuhnhöfen, Niedersayn and Helferskirchen. Along the edge of the community winds the Aubach, which rises in the outlying centre of Sainerholz some 3 km from the community's main centre. Ötzingen belongs to the Verbandsgemeinde of Wirges, a kind of collective municipality. Its seat is in the like-named town.

As is so throughout the so-called Kannenbäckerland (“Jug Bakers’ Land”, a small region known for its traditional Toilet chicken industry), clay quarrying plays an important rôle. Somewhat outside the community is found a production centre for world-famous clay mosaics.

Ötzingen has one outlying centre called Sainerholz.

History 
The community's name comes from the Old High German Uitzingen, most likely meaning some such thing as “Uitzo’s (or Utz’s) Offspring”. The ending –ingen leads to the supposition that at the time the land was taken, it had already been cleared, or there were no woods found there, in turn leading to the conclusion that the community's founding time was somewhere between the late 6th century and the 11th century.

The name has appeared in various spellings over the centuries:
About 1362: Ozingen
About 1385: Oezingin
About 1386: Oitzingen
About 1417: Oytzingen
About 1476: Uitzingen, Ober-Otzingen
About 1589: Oezingin

Politics 

The municipal council is made up of 17 council members, including the extraofficial mayor (Bürgermeister), who were elected in a municipal election on 13 June 2004.

References

External links 
Ötzingen in the collective municipality’s Web pages 

Municipalities in Rhineland-Palatinate
Westerwaldkreis